Erik McCue (born January 18, 2001) is a Swedish professional footballer who plays as a centre back for El Paso Locomotive in the USL Championship.

Club career

Youth 
McCue spent time in the youth setups for F.C. Bangkok and D.C. United before joining the Houston Dynamo academy in 2017. Upon joining the Dynamo academy, McCue quickly established himself in the program, helping lead the U-17 team to the U.S. Soccer Development Academy playoffs for the 2017–18 season and was named U-17 MVP by the coaching staff. He also received the Ricardo Clark Leadership Award for exhibiting "the strongest leadership qualities during the season, regardless of age group." McCue moved up to the U-19 team for the 2018–19 season and wore the captain's armband on multiple occasions.  During the summer of 2018, McCue trained with the Dynamo's USL affiliate club Rio Grande Valley FC as well as with the Dynamo first team. He also spent time training with the Dynamo's PDL team, Brazos Valley Cavalry F.C., but did not feature in a game.

Houston Dynamo 
On October 30, 2018, the Dynamo signed McCue to a Homegrown Player contract ahead of their 2019 season. McCue is the 10th Dynamo academy product to sign a first team contract. He sufferered a foot injury that forced him to miss the start of the 2019 MLS season. McCue was sent on loan to the Dynamo's USL Championship affiliate Rio Grande Valley FC and made his professional debut on March 29, 2019 in a 2–1 loss to the Tulsa Roughnecks. On July 10, McCue was selected to partake in the 2019 MLS Homegrown Game.  In his first season as a professional, he made 3 appearances, all with RGVFC, and spent time training with both the Dynamo first team and the Toros.

2020 saw McCue return to Rio Grande Valley on loan, making 4 appearances in a shortened season due to the COVID-19 pandemic.

Charleston Battery (loan)
On February 24, 2021, McCue joined USL Championship club Charleston Battery on a season-long loan.  He made his Battery debut on May 14, coming on as a substitute in a 3–0 loss to Charlotte Independence.  McCue scored his first career goal on May 23 in a 2–2 draw against New York Red Bulls II.  He ended the season with 15 appearances, 1 goal, and 1 assist as Charleston finished 6th in the Atlantic Division, missing out on the playoffs.

Following the 2021 season, McCue's contract option was declined by Houston.

AB Argir
On 18 February 2022, McCue signed with Betrideildin side AB Argir. He made 23 league appearances for the club.

El Paso Locomotive 
On 9 November 2022, it was announced that McCue had signed for USL Championship club El Paso Locomotive ahead of their 2023 season.

Personal life 
McCue was born in Gothenburg, Sweden and grew up in Onsala, Sweden. He also lived in Bangkok, Thailand, Chengdu, China, Washington, D.C., as well as Houston, Texas as a child.

McCue is eligible to play for both Sweden and the United States at the international level.

Career Statistics

References

External links

2001 births
Living people
Swedish footballers
Swedish expatriate footballers
Association football defenders
Brazos Valley Cavalry FC players
Houston Dynamo FC players
Rio Grande Valley FC Toros players
Charleston Battery players
USL Championship players
Homegrown Players (MLS)
Footballers from Gothenburg
Argja Bóltfelag players
Expatriate footballers in the Faroe Islands
El Paso Locomotive FC players